The 1959 Chico State Wildcats football team represented Chico State College—now known as California State University, Chico—as a member of the Far Western Conference (FWC) during the 1959 NCAA College Division football season. Led by second-year head coach George Maderos, Chico State compiled an overall record of 4–4 with a mark of 2–3 in conference play, placing fourth in the FWC. The team outscored its opponents 186 to 116 for the season. The Wildcats played home games at College Field in Chico, California.

Schedule

Notes

References

Chico State
Chico State Wildcats football seasons
Chico State Wildcats football